Georges-Augustin Bidault (5 October 189927 January 1983) was a French politician. During World War II, he was active in the French Resistance. After the war, he served as foreign minister and prime minister on several occasions. He joined the Organisation armée secrète; however he always denied his involvement.

Biography

Early life
Bidault was born in Moulins, Allier. He studied in the Sorbonne and became a college history teacher. In 1932 he helped to found the Catholic Association of French Youth and the left-wing anti-fascist newspaper l'Aube. He had a column in the paper and, among other things, protested against the Munich Agreement in 1938.

World War II

After the outbreak of the Second World War he joined the French army. He was captured during the Fall of France and was briefly imprisoned. After his release in July 1941, he became a teacher at the Lycée du Parc in Lyon and joined the Liberté group of French Resistance that eventually merged with Combat. Jean Moulin recruited him to organize an underground press and the Combat underground newspaper.

In his work in the resistance, he was helped by his private administrative assistant Laure Diebold.

Bidault, inter alia along with other high profile people, was imprisoned by the Spanish in an Internment camp at Miranda de Ebro.

Bidault participated in the forming of the Conseil National de la Résistance and, after the Gestapo captured Moulin, he became its new chairman. In 1944 he formed a Resistance Charter that recommended an extensive post-war reform program. After the liberation of Paris he represented the Resistance in the victory parade. Charles de Gaulle appointed him as a foreign minister of his provisional government on 25 August. He was the founder of the Popular Republican Movement (MRP).

He was head of the French delegation to the San Francisco Conference, which established the UN, from April to June 1945. At the conference, France succeeded in gaining a permanent seat on the Security Council.

Fourth Republic
On 4 January 1946, Bidault married Suzanne Borel, the first French woman to be employed as a diplomat. The same year he served as foreign minister in Félix Gouin's provisional government. On 19 June 1946, the National Constituent Assembly elected him as president of the provisional government. His government, formed on 15 June, was composed of socialists, communists and Bidault's own MRP. In social policy, Bidault's government was notable for passing important pension and workman's compensation laws. An act of 22 August 1946 extended coverage of family allowances to practically the entire population, while a law of October 1946 provided that insurance of occupation risks "would henceforth be mandatory and that such insurance would be granted by the Social Security that had been created in 1945." In August 1946, an Act was passed that made provision for two-day's holiday a month up to a maximum of 24 working days for young persons between the ages of 14 and 18 and for one-and-a-half days' a month up to a maximum of 18 working days for those aged between 18 and 21. In addition, an Act was passed on 11 October 1946 that introduced occupational medical services.

Bidault later became foreign minister once again. The government held elections to the National Assembly on 29 November after which Bidault resigned. His successor was Léon Blum.

Bidault served in various French governments, first as foreign minister under Paul Ramadier and Robert Schuman. In April 1947 he supported Ramadier's decision to expel the Communists from his government. Bidault had recently been to Moscow and was disturbed by the Soviet regime; he believed an agreement with Stalin was impossible.

In 1949 he became the President of the Council of Ministers (prime minister) but his government lasted only 8 months. During his last term as prime minister, a law of February 1950 that regulated collective bargaining, and contained a guarantee of the right of workers to strike. The same law required the government to fix minimum wages for agriculture and for industry. In Henri Queuille's governments in 1950–1951 he held the office of Vice-president of the Council and under René Pleven and Edgar Faure also the post of defense minister.

In 1952 Bidault became an honorary president of MRP. On 1 June 1953 President Vincent Auriol assigned him to form his own government but the National Assembly refused to give him the official mandate on 10 June. In 1953 Bidault became a presidential candidate but withdrew after the second round.

Bidault was foreign minister during the siege of the French garrison at Dien Bien Phu from March to May 1954. He protested to the Red Cross that the Viet Minh were shooting at clearly marked French medical evacuation flights, killing some of the evacuees. The ongoing fighting in Indochina had exhausted him; he was described by American secretary of state John Foster Dulles as "a deeply harassed man" and later by a historian as "on the verge of a nervous breakdown". Caught between his desires to end the war and to maintain French rule over its colonies, he vacillated between pressing the war, perhaps by asking the Americans for air support, or seeking a negotiated solution. Bidault stated that John Foster Dulles (then Secretary of State of United States) offered France two atomic bombs in 1954.

Fifth Republic
In April 1958 Bidault again became prime minister but did not form a cabinet and had a hand in forming the conservative Christian Democratic Movement. He also supported De Gaulle's presidency after the outbreak of the Algerian War of Independence.

In 1961 Bidault became President of the Executive Council of the Rally for French Algeria and opposed De Gaulle's policy of Algerian independence. He established his own National Resistance Council within the far-right paramilitary organization OAS (Organisation armée secrète). In June 1962 he was accused of conspiring against the state and stripped of his parliamentary immunity. He left for exile in Brazil. In 1967 he moved to Belgium and in 1968 returned to France after benefiting from an amnesty.

In his political memoirs, Bidault stated that he was never involved in the OAS, and was not qualified to give any precise information about its deeds.

When the Front national was founded in October 1972 by members of Ordre nouveau, he participated but resigned from the organisation a few days later.

Bidault died of a stroke in Cambo-les-Bains in January 1983.

Governments

First ministry (24 June – 16 December 1946)
Georges Bidault – Chairman of the Provisional Government and Minister of Foreign Affairs
Maurice Thorez – Vice Chairman of the Provisional Government
Félix Gouin – Vice Chairman of the Provisional Government and Minister of National Defense
Charles Tillon – Minister of Armaments
Édouard Depreux – Minister of the Interior
Robert Schuman – Minister of Finance
François de Menthon – Minister of National Economy
Marcel Paul – Minister of Industrial Production
Ambroise Croizat – Minister of Labour and Social Security
Pierre-Henri Teitgen – Minister of Justice
Marcel Edmond Naegelen – Minister of National Education
François Tanguy-Prigent – Minister of Agriculture
Yves Farge – Minister of Supply
Marius Moutet – Minister of Overseas France
Jules Moch – Minister of Public Works and Transport
Robert Prigent – Minister of Population
François Billoux – Minister of Reconstruction and Town Planning
Jean Letourneau – Minister of Posts
Alexandre Varenne – Minister of State
Francisque Gay – Minister of State

Second ministry (28 October 1949 – 7 February 1950)
Georges Bidault – President of the Council
Jules Moch – Vice President of the Council and Minister of the Interior
Henri Queuille – Vice President of the Council
Robert Schuman – Minister of Foreign Affairs
René Pleven – Minister of National Defense
Maurice Petsche – Minister of Finance and Economic Affairs
Robert Lacoste – Minister of Commerce and Industry
Pierre Segelle – Minister of Labour and Social Security
René Mayer – Minister of Justice
Yvon Delbos – Minister of National Education
Louis Jacquinot – Minister of Veterans and War Victims
Pierre Pflimlin – Minister of Agriculture
Jean Letourneau – Minister of Overseas France
Christian Pineau – Minister of Public Works, Transport, and Tourism
Pierre Schneiter – Minister of Public Health and Population
Eugène Claudius-Petit – Minister of Reconstruction and Town Planning
Eugène Thomas – Minister of Posts
Pierre-Henri Teitgen – Minister of State

Changes:
2 December 1949 – Gabriel Valay succeeds Pflimlin as Minister of Agriculture

Third Ministry (7 February – 2 July 1950)
Georges Bidault – President of the Council
Henri Queuille – Vice President of the Council and Minister of the Interior
Robert Schuman – Minister of Foreign Affairs
René Pleven – Minister of National Defense
Maurice Petsche – Minister of Finance and Economics Affairs
Jean-Marie Louvel – Minister of Commerce and Industry
Paul Bacon – Minister of Labour and Social Security
René Mayer – Minister of Justice
Yvon Delbos – Minister of National Education
Louis Jacquinot – Minister of Veterans and War Victims
Gabriel Valay – Minister of Agriculture
Jean Letourneau – Minister of Overseas France
Jacques Chastellain – Minister of Public Works, Transport, and Tourism
Pierre Schneiter – Minister of Public Health and Population
Eugène Claudius-Petit – Minister of Reconstruction and Town Planning
Charles Brune – Minister of Posts
Pierre-Henri Teitgen – Minister of State

References

Sources and further reading

 Bidault, Georges. Resistance: The Political Autobiography of Georges Bidault (Praeger, 1965) online

External links
 

1899 births
1983 deaths
20th-century heads of state of France
20th-century Princes of Andorra
Politicians from Moulins, Allier
French Roman Catholics
Popular Democratic Party (France) politicians
Popular Republican Movement politicians
Heads of state of France
Prime Ministers of France
French Foreign Ministers
Members of the Constituent Assembly of France (1945)
Members of the Constituent Assembly of France (1946)
Deputies of the 1st National Assembly of the French Fourth Republic
Deputies of the 2nd National Assembly of the French Fourth Republic
Deputies of the 3rd National Assembly of the French Fourth Republic
Deputies of the 1st National Assembly of the French Fifth Republic
French military personnel of World War I
French Resistance members
Members of the Organisation armée secrète
Companions of the Liberation
Grand Croix of the Légion d'honneur
Lycée Louis-le-Grand teachers